The 1946 Iowa Conference football season was the season of college football played by the 13 member schools of the Iowa Conference as part of the 1946 college football season. The Central Dutch and Upper Iowa Peacocks were co-champions of the conference, each compiling perfect 6–0 records against conference opponents. None of the Iowa Conference teams was ranked in the Associated Press poll or played in a bowl game.

Conference overview

Teams

Central

The 1946 Central Dutch football team was an American football team that represented Central College of Pella, Iowa, as a member of the Iowa Conference during the 1946 college football season. Led by head coach Richard Tysseling, the Dutch compiled a 7–1 record, shared the Iowa Conference championship with Upper Iowa, and outscored opponents by a total of 223 to 38.

Upper Iowa

The 1946 Upper Iowa Peacocks football team was an American football team that represented Upper Iowa University as a member of the Iowa Conference during the 1946 college football season. In their 37th season under head coach John "Doc" Dorman, the Peacocks compiled a 6–0 record, shared the Iowa Conference championship with Central Central (IA), and outscored opponents by a total of 139 to 31.

Upper Iowa end Melvin Harms was a unanimous choice by the United Press for the  1946 All-Iowa Conference football team. Quarterback Sam Turner and guard Ralph Bartlett also received first-team honors.

The university had an enrollment of 500 students in the fall of 1946, at least 300 of whom were freshmen.

St. Ambrose

The 1946 St. Ambrose Bees football team was an American football team that represented St. Ambrose University of Davenport, Iowa, as a member of the Iowa Conference during the 1946 college football season. Led by head coach Ennio Arboit, the Bees compiled a 5–3 record, finished in third place in the Iowa Conference, and outscored opponents by a total of 101 to 77.

Parsons

The 1946 Parsons Wildcats football team was an American football team that represented Parsons College of Fairfield, Iowa, as a member of the Iowa Conference during the 1946 college football season. Led by head coach Phillip E. Young, the Wildcats compiled a 4–4 record, finished in fourth place in the Iowa Conference, and outscored opponents by a total of 116 to 104.

Dubuque

The 1946 Dubuque Spartans football team was an American football team that represented the University of Dubuque of Dubuque, Iowa, as a member of the Iowa Conference during the 1946 college football season. Led by head coach Kenneth E. Mercer, the Spartans compiled a 5–4 record, finished in fifth place in the Iowa Conference, and outscored opponents by a total of 92 to 76.

Luther

The 1946 Luther Norse football team was an American football team that represented the Luther College of Decorah, Iowa, as a member of the Iowa Conference during the 1946 college football season. Led by head coach Robert Bungum, the Spartans compiled a 3–6 record, finished in sixth place in the Iowa Conference, and were outscored by a total of 136 to 81.

Simpson

The 1946 Simpson Redmen football team was an American football team that represented the Simpson College of Indianola, Iowa, as a member of the Iowa Conference during the 1946 college football season. Led by head coach Frank L. Casey, the Redmen compiled a 3–5 record, finished in seventh place in the Iowa Conference, and were outscored by a total of 135 to 79.

Iowa Wesleyan

The 1946 Iowa Wesleyan Tigers football team was an American football team that represented the Iowa Wesleyan University of Mount Pleasant, Iowa, as a member of the Iowa Conference during the 1946 college football season. Led by head coach Olan Ruble, the Tigers compiled a 3–6 record, tied for eighth place in the Iowa Conference, and were outscored by a total of 159 to 75.

Buena Vista

The 1946 Buena Vista Beavers football team was an American football team that represented the Buena Vista University of Storm Lake, Iowa, as a member of the Iowa Conference during the 1946 college football season. Led by head coach Harland A. Riebe, the Beavers compiled a 1–6 record, tied for eighth place in the Iowa Conference, and were outscored by a total of 103 to 38.

Wartburg

The 1946 Wartburg Knights football team was an American football team that represented the Wartburg College of Waverly, Iowa, as a member of the Iowa Conference during the 1946 college football season. Led by head coach Stanley Hall, the Knights compiled a 2–5 record, finished in tenth place in the Iowa Conference, and were outscored by a total of 124 to 85.

Western Union

The 1946 Western Union Eagles football team was an American football team that represented Western Union College of LeMars, Iowa (later renamed Westmar University), as a member of the Iowa Conference during the 1946 college football season. Led by head coach Dick Crayne, the Eagles compiled a 5–2 record, finished in a tie for 11th place in the Iowa Conference, and outscored opponents by a total of 117 to 70.

Loras

The 1946 Loras Duhawks football team was an American football team that represented Loras College of Dubuque, Iowa as a member of the Iowa Conference during the 1946 college football season. Led by head coach Vince Dowd, the Duhawks compiled a 1–7 record, finished in a tie for 11th place in the Iowa Conference, and were outscored opponents by a total of 181 to 43.

William Penn

The 1946 William Penn Quakers football team was an American football team that represented William Penn University of Oskaloosa, Iowa as a member of the Iowa Conference during the 1946 college football season. Led by head coach Roland Ortmayer, the Quakers compiled a 0–6 record, finished in last place in the Iowa Conference, and were outscored opponents by a total of 174 to 12.

All-conference team
The following players were selected by the United Press to the 1946 All-Iowa Conference football team:

 Quarterback: Sam Turner, Upper Iowa
 Halfbacks: Bill Schumaker, Parsons; Galen Cheuvront, Central
 Fullback: Bob Sellgren, Dubuque
 Ends: Melvin Harms, Upper Iowa; Howard Lowe, Central
 Tackles: Floyd Lundquist, Parsons; Chet Cross, Central
 Guards: Bob Berg, Parsons; Ralph Bartlett, Upper Iowa
 Center: Bob Kuefler, Dubuque

References